John Robert Kennaday (September 12, 1830 – 1884) was an American lawyer and politician from New York.

Life
He was the son of Rev. John Kennaday DD (1800–1863). He graduated from Dickinson College. Then he studied law, was admitted to the bar, practiced in New York City and resided in Brooklyn. He married Anna Martin (died 1884).

He was a member of the New York State Assembly (Kings Co., 2nd D.) in 1875.

He was a member of the New York State Senate (2nd D.) in 1876 and 1877.

Sources
 Life Sketches of Government Officers and Members of the Legislature of the State of New York in 1875 by W. H. McElroy and Alexander McBride (pg. 216ff)
 DIED; ANNA MARTIN KENNADAY (his daughter), in NYT on December 1, 1865
 DIED; ANNA M. KENNADAY (his wife) in NYT on March 15, 1884
 PAUL KENNADAY DIED AT AGE OF 56 (his son), in NYT on May 5, 1929 (subscription required)

External links
 Portrait at New York Public Library Digital Gallery

1830 births
Democratic Party New York (state) state senators
People from Brooklyn
Democratic Party members of the New York State Assembly
Dickinson College alumni
Politicians from Kingston, New York
1884 deaths
19th-century American politicians